Alvin Lamar Worthy (born July 27, 1982), known professionally as Westside Gunn, is an American rapper. He is a co-founder of independent hip-hop label Griselda Records. He is the brother of rapper Conway The Machine and cousin of rapper Benny the Butcher, both of whom he frequently collaborates with. Westside Gunn has released four studio albums in addition to an extensive catalog of mixtapes. Gunn was affiliated with Shady Records from 2017 to 2020, but has since returned to independent status.

Career
Westside Gunn released his first mixtape in 2005, however his career was derailed by run-ins with the law.  Gunn did not release any music in the years 2006-2011.

In 2012, Westside Gunn co-founded the Griselda Records label with his paternal half-brother Conway the Machine and Mach-Hommy. Gunn was inspired to revitalize his career by the shooting of his brother Conway that same year, which left him with permanent disabilities, as well as by the 2006 murder of his cousin Machine Gun Black. Gunn’s first project for Griselda was the mixtape Hitler Wears Hermes. While the name attracted controversy for its reference to Adolf Hitler, Gunn explained that the name is a play on The Devil Wears Prada.

Over the next few years, Gunn released a steady stream of mixtapes and EPs, including multiple sequels to Hitler Wears Hermes, on the Griselda label. Gunn’s official studio album debut was Flygod, released on March 11, 2016.

On March 3, 2017, Griselda Records signed a deal with Eminem's Shady Records, making Westside Gunn and Conway the first rappers from Buffalo to sign with a major label. After signing with Shady, Gunn played at Coachella, Firefly and Governors Ball. On October 2, 2020, Westside Gunn released his Shady Records debut, Who Made the Sunshine, his only solo project with Shady Records.

Shortly after signing with Shady Records, Westside released Flygod Is Good... All the Time, as a collaborative EP with producer Mr. Green.  Ambrosia For Heads named 2018's Supreme Blientele one of the best albums of 2018. He also signed with Roc Nation alongside label mate Benny the Butcher on August 6, 2019, under a management deal.

On April 17, 2020, he released his third studio album, Pray for Paris. The album has features from artists such as Tyler, the Creator, Wale, Joey Badass and Freddie Gibbs. On July 3, 2020, Westside Gunn released his tenth mixtape Flygod Is an Awesome God II, the sequel to his July 2019 mixtape Flygod Is an Awesome God. The album features guest appearances by frequent collaborators Benny The Butcher, Keisha Plum, Boldy James, and Daringer.

On November 14, 2020, in an interview with Joe Budden, Gunn announced he had fulfilled his contractual obligations to Shady Records and had become an independent artist.

In 2021, he released two songs titled "TV Boy" and "Julia Lang". The track "Julia Lang" was titled after fashion entrepreneur Julia Lang.

Personal life
Gunn has stated within various interviews that he's a "devout wrestling fan" and often references this within his song lyrics and song titles. He often can be seen in the front-row seats of the audience of Impact Wrestling, WWE and All Elite Wrestling events. He maintains friendships with wrestlers Parker Boudreaux, Lio Rush, Finn Bálor, Bianca Belair, Montez Ford, Montel Vontavious Porter, Sonjay Dutt , Daniel Garcia, and Myron Reed. When asked who were his top 5 wrestlers on fellow rapper Smoke DZA's "Personal Podcast", he stated "It always changes but Hulk Hogan, The Rock, Bret Hart, The Undertaker and Chris Benoit". On the September 7, 2022 edition of All Elite Wrestling Dynamite, Gunn escorted wrestler and close friend Daniel Garcia to the ring to face Wheeler Yuta in an ROH Pure Championship match, which Garcia won.

Discography

Studio albums 
 Flygod (2016)
 Supreme Blientele (2018)
 Pray for Paris (2020)
 Who Made the Sunshine (2020)
 & Then U Pray for Me (2023)

With Griselda 
 Don't Get Scared Now (2016)
 WWCD (2019)

EPs
 There's God and There's Flygod, Praise Both (2016)
 Riots on Fashion Avenue (with Mil Beats) (2017)
 WestSide Doom (with MF Doom) (2017)
 Flygod Is Good... All the Time (with Mr. Green) (2018)

Mixtapes
 Flyest Nigga in Charge Vol. 1 (2005)
Hitler Wears Hermes (2012)
 Hitler Wears Hermes 2 (2014)	
 Hitler Wears Hermes 3 (2015)
 Hitler Wears Hermes 4 (2016)
 Hitler Wears Hermes 5 (2017)
 Hitler Wears Hermes 6 (2018)
 Flygod is an Awesome God (2019)
 Hitler Wears Hermes 7 (2019)
 Flygod is an Awesome God II (2020)
 Hitler Wears Hermes 8: Sincerly, Adolf (2021)
 Hitler Wears Hermes 8: Side B (2021)
 Peace "Fly" God (2022)
 10 (2022)

Collaborative mixtapes
 Hall & Nash (with Conway The Machine) (2015)	
 Griselda Ghost (with Conway The Machine and Big Ghost LTD) (2015)
 Roses are Red So... Is Blood (with The Purist) (2016)
 Hitler on Steroids (with DJ Green Lantern) (2017)

References 

1982 births
Living people
Five percenters
American male rappers
Shady Records artists
East Coast hip hop musicians
21st-century American rappers
Rappers from New York (state)
Musicians from Buffalo, New York
American music industry executives
Underground rappers
Indie rappers
Gangsta rappers
21st-century American male musicians
Businesspeople from Buffalo, New York
21st-century African-American musicians